Rheocles lateralis, is a species of rainbowfish in the subfamily Bedotiinae, the Madagascar rainbowfishes. It is endemic to Madagascar where it is endemic to the Nosivolo River.

Sources

lateralis
Fish described in 1992
Taxonomy articles created by Polbot